Jago Mikulic is a Paralympic athletics competitor from Australia who competed in the 1976 Summer Paralympics as a classified "A" athlete in the Men's 60 m, Long Jump, Shot Put, Pentathlon and Javelin. He won two medals: a silver medal in the Men's Javelin A event and a bronze in the Men's Pentathlon A event.

References

Paralympic athletes of Australia
Athletes (track and field) at the 1976 Summer Paralympics
Paralympic silver medalists for Australia
Paralympic bronze medalists for Australia
Living people
Year of birth missing (living people)
Medalists at the 1976 Summer Paralympics
Paralympic medalists in athletics (track and field)
Australian male sprinters
Australian male long jumpers
Australian male shot putters
Australian male javelin throwers
Australian pentathletes
Paralympic sprinters
Paralympic long jumpers
Paralympic shot putters
Paralympic javelin throwers